Cryptandra dielsii is a flowering plant in the family Rhamnaceae and is endemic to the south-west of Western Australia. It is a spreading shrub with linear to narrowly oblong leaves and dense clusters of white, hairy, tube-shaped flowers.

Description
The flowers are white, borne in dense clusters of 6 to 9,  in diameter, surrounded by large involucral bracts, the individual flowers not distinct. Flowering occurs from July to September.

Taxonomy and naming
Cryptandra dielsii was first formally described in 2007 by Barbara Lynette Rye in the journal Nuytsia from an unpublished description by Charles Gardner, of specimens he collected near Tammin in 1936. The specific epithet (dielsii ) honours Ludwig Diels.

Distribution and habitat
This cryptandra mainly grows with shrubby she-oak (Allocasuarina campestris) between Manmanning, Varley and Lake King in the Avon Wheatbelt and Mallee bioregions of south-western Western Australia.

Conservation status
Cryptandra dielsii is listed as "Priority Three" by the Government of Western Australia Department of Biodiversity, Conservation and Attractions, meaning that it is poorly known and known from only a few locations but is not under imminent threat.

References

dielsii
Rosales of Australia
Flora of Western Australia
Plants described in 2007
Taxa named by Barbara Lynette Rye